The year 1500 in art involved some significant events and new works.

Events
 26 July: Bartolomeo di Pagholo ("Baccio della Porta") becomes a Dominican friar.
 Sandro Botticelli begins painting of Adoration of the Christ Child (1500-1510) as a tondo (round painting), oil on panel.

Works

 Fra Bartolomeo – Annunciation (oil tempera on wood; Uffizi, Florence)
 Sandro Botticelli – The Mystical Nativity (National Gallery, London)
 Cima da Conegliano - Madonna and Child (National Museum Wales)
 Albrecht Dürer
 Lamentation of Christ (approximate date)
 Paumgartner altarpiece (approximate date)
 Self-Portrait
 Seven Sorrows Polyptych (approximate date)
 Giorgione – Adoration of the Shepherds (approximate completion date)
Pietro Perugino - Vallombrosa Altarpiece

Births
3 November - Benvenuto Cellini, Italian artist (died 1571)
date unknown
 Hans Sebald Beham, German printmaker, engraver, designer of woodcuts, painter and miniaturist (died 1550)
 Niccolò Boldrini, Italian engraver (died 1566)
 Giulio Campi, Italian painter and architect (died 1572)
Pompeo Cesura, Italian painter and engraver (died 1571)
Jean Chartier, French painter, draughtsman, printer and publisher (died 1580)
Pieter Claeissens the Elder, Flemish painter (died 1576)
Jean Cousin the Elder, French painter, sculptor, etcher, engraver, and geometrician (died 1593)
Juan Vicente Macip (or Vicente Joanes Masip), Spanish painter of the Renaissance period (died 1579)
Alessandro Oliverio, Italian painter (died 1544)
Niccolò Tribolo, Italian Mannerist artist (died 1550)
approximate year of birth
Girolamo Mazzola Bedoli, Italian painter of the Parmesan School of Painting (died 1569)
Domenico Campagnola, Italian painter and engraver of the Renaissance period (died 1564); he was a pupil of his father, the painter Giulio Campagnola
Giovanni Battista Castello, Italianhistorical painter (died 1569/1579)
Giovanni Filippo Criscuolo, Italian painter (died 1584)
Albrecht Glockendon the Younger, German miniaturist and woodcutter (died 1545)
Jean Mone, German-Flemish sculptor (died 1548)
Luca Penni, Italian painter, member of the School of Fontainebleau (died 1556)
Georg Pencz, German engraver, painter and printmaker (died 1550)
Ligier Richier, French sculptor (died 1567)
Jan van Amstel, Dutch Northern Renaissance painter (died 1542)
Jan Sanders van Hemessen, Flemish Northern Renaissance painter (died 1566)

Deaths
date unknown
Antonio del Rincón, Spanish painter and artist (born 1446)
Neroccio di Bartolomeo de' Landi, Italian painter and sculptor (born 1447)
Friedrich Herlin, German painter (born c.1425)
Bernardo Tesauro, Neapolitan fresco painter (born 1440)

References

 
1500s in art